Tanard Davis (born January 27, 1983) is a former American football cornerback. He was signed by the Indianapolis Colts as an undrafted free agent in 2006. He played college football at the University of Miami.

Davis earned a Super Bowl ring as a member of the Colts' practice squad during Super Bowl XLI. He has also been a member of the Carolina Panthers, Philadelphia Eagles, St. Louis Rams, New Orleans Saints and Tennessee Titans. He is now a pro Jai Alai player, currently placing first in the most wins at the Magic City Jai Alai fronton. This is his rookie season and is part of a class of 18 rookie Jai Alai players at Magic City Casino. He is considered a top prospect in the sport of Jai Alai.

External links
Carolina Panthers bio
Indianapolis Colts bio
Miami Hurricanes bio
St. Louis Rams bio
Tennessee Titans bio

1983 births
Living people
Players of American football from Miami
American football cornerbacks
American football safeties
Miami Hurricanes football players
Indianapolis Colts players
Carolina Panthers players
Philadelphia Eagles players
St. Louis Rams players
New Orleans Saints players
Tennessee Titans players